Henry J. Linde (December 31, 1879 – 1917) was an American attorney who served as the 9th North Dakota Attorney General for one term from 1915 to 1916.

Linde was born near Ridgeway  in Winneshiek County, Iowa. He was educated at Luther College in Decorah, Iowa, where he graduated in the spring of 1901. He studied at the University of Minnesota Law School and graduated in the spring of 1906.

He was a teacher in science and English literature at Park Region Luther College in Fergus Falls, Minnesota. He came to Plaza, North Dakota in July 1906 and engaged in the practice of law. He later moved to Stanley, North Dakota, when Mountrail County, North Dakota was organized. He was elected to the North Dakota House of Representatives  in 1908  and to the North Dakota Senate in 1910  as a Republican. He was elected the state's attorney general in 1914.

References

Bibliography
 North Dakota Secretary of State. "North Dakota Blue Book" (1911), pp. 531.

1879 births
1917 deaths
University of Minnesota Law School alumni
North Dakota Attorneys General
Republican Party members of the North Dakota House of Representatives
Republican Party North Dakota state senators
Luther College (Iowa) alumni
American people of Norwegian descent
19th-century American politicians